The Hector Formation is a geologic formation in California. It preserves fossils dating back to the Neogene period.

See also

 List of fossiliferous stratigraphic units in California
 Paleontology in California

References
 

Neogene California